The Oneia Mountains ( or Oneia Ori) are a low mountain range in Corinthia, northeastern Peloponnese, Greece. The range extends 9 km from west to east, starting west of the village of Solomos, passing south of the village of Xylokeriza and ending near the Bay of Kechries, on the Saronic Gulf.

The highest peaks are Profitis Ilias, at 581m, and Oxy, at 562 meters. The other two peaks measure 507m and 229m respectively.

The range is also known in the singular as Mt Oneio or Mt Oneion, as well as the Xylokeriza Mountains.

External links
 Climbing on Oneia Mountains routes.gr

References

Landforms of Corinthia
Mountain ranges of Greece
Landforms of Peloponnese (region)